This is a list of Estonian football transfers in the winter transfer window 2021–22 by club.

This transfer window is open between the 2021 Meistriliiga and the 2022 Meistriliiga season. 1 club has changed: JK Tallinna Kalev joins Estonian top division, while Viljandi JK Tulevik was relegated.

Meistriliiga

FCI Levadia

In:

Out:

Flora

In:

Out:

Paide Linnameeskond

In:

Out:

Nõmme Kalju

In:

Out:

Tallinna Legion

In:

Out:

Narva Trans

In:

Out:

Kuressaare

In:

Out:

Tartu Tammeka

In:

Out:

Pärnu Vaprus

In:

Out:

Tallinna Kalev

In:

Out:

References

External links
 Official site of the Estonian Football Association
 Official site of the Meistriliiga

Estonian
transfers
transfers
2021–22